Bright is a 2017 American urban fantasy action film directed by David Ayer, written by Max Landis, and starring Will Smith, Joel Edgerton, Noomi Rapace, Lucy Fry, Édgar Ramírez, and Ike Barinholtz. The film is set in an alternate present in which humans and mythical creatures co-exist and details an LAPD police officer and his orc partner confronting racism and police corruption while protecting a magic wand and the elf girl who wields it.

Principal photography began in November 2016 in Los Angeles. The film was released worldwide on Netflix on December 22, 2017. While it has received largely negative reviews from critics, it has become one of Netflix's most streamed movies ever.

Plot
Humans coexist with other sentient species, notably orcs and elves. While magic is real, its practice is illegal. Rare magical artifacts known as magic wands exist, but only a select few individuals called "Brights" can wield them without dying.

In Los Angeles, veteran LAPD officer Daryl Ward has been involuntarily partnered with Nick Jakoby, the nation's first orc police officer. Jakoby is equally detested by the other officers for his race and his fellow orcs for being a policeman. Ward's relationship with Jakoby is strained since Ward was shot by an orc robber Jakoby failed to apprehend; Internal Affairs suspects Jakoby deliberately let him go.

One night, Ward and Jakoby respond to a disturbance at a safe house for the "Shield of Light", an extremist group that prophesies the return of the "Dark Lord", an ancient semi-mythical figure defeated many millennia ago. Inside, Ward and Jakoby apprehend the lone survivor, an elf girl named Tikka in possession of a wand. Ward calls for backup, but the moment the four arriving officers see the wand, they try to coerce Ward into killing Jakoby and letting them steal the wand for themselves.

Ward goes outside, demanding the truth about the robber. Jakoby admits he lost sight of Ward's assailant and mistakenly apprehended a second, younger orc; he then helped him flee, knowing that the backup officers would probably kill the boy on sight. When the four officers appear behind Ward, planning to kill both him and Jakoby, Ward turns and guns them down. The gunfire attracts the attention of the local Hispanic gang, while rumors of the wand draw the attentions of both its owner Leilah, the leader of the radical elf sect the Inferni, and Kandomere, an elf FBI agent assigned to the federal "Magic Task Force".

The gangsters corner the trio in a strip club, but are slaughtered by Leilah, allowing the trio to escape again. At a service station, Ward contacts his friend, Sheriff Deputy Rodriguez, whom he trusts. Rodriguez contacts Kandomere, but Leilah intercepts their conversation, attacks the service station and kills him.

Escaping again, the trio is captured by the Fogteeth Orcs, whose leader Dorghu also wants the wand. He orders his son Mikey to kill Jakoby, but he is the orc that Jakoby saved and refuses to kill him. Sending his son away, he kills Jakoby himself. As he prepares to kill Ward, Tikka produces the wand and resurrects Jakoby, showing she is a Bright. The Fogteeth's shaman pronounces this to be part of a prophecy, causing the clan to kneel to them, setting them free. Tikka explains that the Inferni believe that assembling three wands will allow them to resurrect the Dark Lord. She also reveals that she was once a member of the Inferni, but she fled the group and was sheltered by the Shield of Light. Leilah loaned her wand to a Bright assassin to kill Tikka, but she killed the assassin, taking the wand.

Using the wand to resurrect Jakoby has made Tikka gravely ill, and she can only be healed in a magical pool at the safe house. Returning there, they are ambushed by Leilah and her two enforcers. In the confrontation, Leilah's guards are killed, but Leilah holds Tikka helpless as Ward and Jakoby run out of ammunition. Ward deliberately grabs the wand, believing that the resulting explosion will kill all of them. To everyone's amazement, Ward survives handling the wand, revealing he is also a Bright. He kills Leilah with the wand, triggering an explosion that sets the building on fire. Tikka disappears and the injured Ward and Jakoby escape the burning building with Jakoby leading the way, as he exits he realises Ward is not with him and has become trapped somewhere during their escape. Casting aside first responders who were attempting to administer aid, Jakoby charges back into the fire to rescue his partner, pulling him from the flames and debris just in time, this is witnessed by the Fogteeth clan and Dorghu 'bloods' Jakoby (a mark of great respect within Orc society) for his act of bravery.

In the hospital, Ward and Jakoby, understanding that the federal agents want any hint of magical activity kept secret, give Kandomere a doctored account of the previous night's events.

In a public ceremony, Jakoby, Ward and Rodriguez are honored. Ward smiles as he spots Tikka moving through the crowd in disguise.

Cast
 Will Smith as Daryl Ward, a human LAPD officer.
 Joel Edgerton as Nick Jakoby, the nation's first orc police officer who is partnered with Daryl.
 Noomi Rapace as Leilah, an Inferni elf seeking control of the magic wand.
 Lucy Fry as Tikka, a young Inferni elf who is in possession of the magic wand.
 Édgar Ramírez as Kandomere, a high ranking elvish federal agent with the US Department of Magic's Magic Task Force.
 Ike Barinholtz as Pollard, a corrupt human LAPD officer who seeks to steal the wand for himself.
 Happy Anderson as Hildebrandt Ulysses Montehugh, a human federal agent who works under Kandomere in the Magic Task Force.
 Dawn Olivieri as Sherri Ward, Daryl's human wife and Sophia's mother.
 Matt Gerald as Hicks, a corrupt human LAPD officer.
 Margaret Cho as Ching, a corrupt human LAPD sergeant.
 Brad William Henke as Dorghu, the imposing leader of the Fogteeth Orcs gang.
 Jay Hernandez as Rodriguez, a human LASD deputy.
 Veronica Ngo as Tien, an Inferni elf enforcer working for Leilah.
 Alex Meraz as Serafin, an Inferni elf enforcer working for Leilah.
 Nadia Gray as Larika, an elf assassin working for Leilah.
 Joseph Piccuirro as Brown, a corrupt human LAPD officer.
 Enrique Murciano as Poison, the crippled leader of the human Altamira gang who uses a wheelchair.
 Scarlet Spencer as Sophia Ward, Daryl and Sherri's human daughter.
 Andrea Navedo as Perez, a human LAPD captain and Ward's superior.
 Kenneth Choi as Yamahara, a human LAPD internal affairs detective.
 Bobby Naderi as Arkashian, a human LAPD internal affairs detective.
 Cle Shaheed Sloan as OG Mike, the Wards' human neighbor.
 Chris Browning as Serling, a human questioned by the US Department of Magic's Task Force.
 Joe Rogan as himself, he is seen interviewing an orc about Jakoby.

Production

Described as "a contemporary cop thriller, but with fantastical elements", the film was directed by David Ayer and stars Will Smith and Joel Edgerton, with a script penned by Max Landis, which Ayer rewrote. Netflix officially picked up the film for a $90 million deal with filming beginning in fall 2016, making it the most expensive Netflix film to date. Noomi Rapace entered talks to join the cast in May 2016. Landis stated in an interview that official production was expected to begin in September 2016, but that they had already shot a small part in Los Angeles. Ayer's frequent cinematographer, Roman Vasyanov, was confirmed to be working on the project. On October 15, 2016, Lucy Fry was added to the cast. On October 17, 2016, Andrea Navedo was added to the cast. On October 20, 2016, actor Brad William Henke was cast in the film. On November 1, 2016, Kenneth Choi and Dawn Olivieri were cast in an unnamed role and the role of Smith's wife, respectively. On November 9, Édgar Ramírez was confirmed to be added to the cast. That same month, Alex Meraz, Matt Gerald, Ike Barinholtz and Enrique Murciano joined the cast of the film in undisclosed roles.

Filming
Photos from the set were first published in November 2016. Filming was completed by February 4, 2017.

Reception

Critical response
Bright received criticism for its screenplay, cinematography, poor worldbuilding, and excessive focus on social commentary. On Rotten Tomatoes, the film holds an approval rating of 27% based on 114 reviews, with an average rating of 4.1/10. The website's critical consensus reads, "Bright tries to blend fantasy, hard-hitting cop drama, and social commentary—and ends up falling painfully short of the mark on all three fronts." On Metacritic the film has a weighted average score of 29 out of 100, based on 26 critics, indicating "generally unfavorable reviews".

Richard Roeper of the Chicago Sun-Times gave the film 1.5 out of 4 stars, saying: "Bright is basically a tired buddy-cop movie dressed up in bizarre trappings ... It doesn’t take itself too seriously, but it’s not nearly as self-deprecating and funny as it needed to be." Writing for Rolling Stone, David Fear gave the film 1 out of 4 stars, criticizing the script and incoherent action scenes, writing: "This combo of gritty cop procedural and fantasy is a dark, dank, dumb-as-hell mess."

David Ehrlich of IndieWire gave the film an "F" and called it the worst film of 2017, saying: "There's boring, there's bad, and then there's Bright ... from the director of Suicide Squad and the writer of Victor Frankenstein comes a fresh slice of hell that somehow represents new lows for them both—a dull and painfully derivative ordeal that often feels like it was made just to put those earlier misfires into perspective." Ayer responded enthusiastically to Ehrlich's review, claiming that he desired for the film to receive "a strong reaction either way."

NPR's Chris Klimek wrote: "Critics have already lined up to pillory Bright as among the year's worst releases. Don't believe the clickbait. Lazy but not boring, this Net-flick is perfectly, stubbornly mediocre, and less a chore to sit through than either of 2017's Vin Diesel vehicles."

Audience response
Several publications noted that while critics were harsh in their assessment of the film, viewers seemed to enjoy it more and gave positive reactions on social media. Netflix announced that the film had been viewed more times in its first week than any of its other releases. According to Nielsen ratings, about 11 million American viewers streamed Bright within the first three days of its release, with 56% of the audience being male and 7 million being between the ages of 18 to 49. Netflix CEO Reed Hastings noted that: "The critics are pretty disconnected from the mass appeal...[they] are an important part of the artistic process but are pretty disconnected from the commercial prospects of a film. If people are watching this movie and loving it, that's the measurement of success."

Soundtrack

The soundtrack, titled Bright: The Album, was released under Atlantic Records on December 15, 2017, just a week before the official release of the film on December 22, 2017. It features songs performed by various artists including Future, Camila Cabello, Logic, Marshmello, Ty Dolla $ign, Bebe Rexha, Lil Uzi Vert, Snoop Dogg, and X Ambassadors.

Charts

Future

Scrapped sequel
In December 2017, Netflix ordered a sequel. The following month, Netflix confirmed the sequel was moving ahead, with Smith and Edgerton reprising their roles and Ayer directing and writing the script with Evan Spiliotopoulos. In August 2018, it was announced the film would begin filming in March 2019 in Germany. In September 2019, Lucy Fry revealed that production had been delayed, citing Smith's busy schedule. In May 2020, it was reported that Netflix had entered negotiations with Louis Leterrier, director of The Incredible Hulk and Now You See Me, to direct the sequel. In April 2022, following Smith's altercation with Chris Rock at the Academy Awards, Netflix scrapped the film.

Anime spin-off

In June 2021, Netflix announced that an anime spin-off film called Bright: Samurai Soul would be produced. It was announced that Kyōhei Ishiguro would direct the film, with Michiko Yokote writing the film's script, Atsushi Yamagata designing the characters, and Arect animating the film. The film premiered on October 12, 2021.

See also
 Alien Nation
 Cast a Deadly Spell
 Onward
 Shadowrun 
 Special Unit 2
 Ugly Americans
 Witch Hunt
 Wishfart

References

External links
 Bright on Netflix
 

2017 films
2010s fantasy action films
2010s buddy cop films
American buddy cop films
American police detective films
American science fiction action films
American urban fantasy films
Bright (franchise)
Elves in popular culture
English-language Netflix original films
Fictional portrayals of the Los Angeles Police Department
Films about magic
Films about police brutality
Films about police corruption
Films about police misconduct
Films about racism
Films about terrorism in the United States
Films directed by David Ayer
Films scored by David Sardy
Films set in Los Angeles
Films shot in Los Angeles
Films with screenplays by Max Landis
Hood films
Orcs in popular culture
Overbrook Entertainment films
2010s English-language films
2010s American films